Goran Radojević (born 9 November 1963) is a retired Serbian footballer, who also holds German citizenship.

Career
Radojević began his career at his hometown-club Radnički Kragujevac, before playing for Rad, Spartak Subotica, and NK Osijek in Yugoslavia. In 1990, he moved to Austria, where he spent two seasons with Sturm Graz in the Austrian Bundesliga. At the end of his career, he had stints in Germany with Sportfreunde Siegen and Eintracht Braunschweig.

Post-retirement
After retiring as a player, Radojević has stayed in Germany, where he lives in the Braunschweig/Wolfenbüttel area and has managed several teams at the amateur and youth level.

References

External links
 

1963 births
Living people
Yugoslav emigrants to Germany
Yugoslav footballers
Serbian footballers
Serbian football managers
Association football forwards
Serbia and Montenegro expatriate footballers
Serbia and Montenegro footballers
Yugoslav expatriate footballers
FK Radnički 1923 players
FK Rad players
FK Spartak Subotica players
NK Osijek players
SK Sturm Graz players
Sportfreunde Siegen players
Eintracht Braunschweig players
Eintracht Braunschweig non-playing staff
Expatriate footballers in Germany
Expatriate footballers in Austria
Yugoslav expatriates in Austria
Serbia and Montenegro expatriate sportspeople in Germany
Austrian Football Bundesliga players
Serbian emigrants to Germany